Aurora Peak is an Antarctic peak  high along the west side of the Mertz Glacier,  south of Mount Murchison. It was discovered by the Australasian Antarctic Expedition (1911–14) under Douglas Mawson. The members of the eastern coastal party (A. L. McLean, P. E. Correll, and C. T. Madigan) named it after the expedition ship Aurora [1].

References
 
 [1] Mawson, Douglas, Sir, 1882 - 1958. The home of the blizzard : a heroic tale of antarctic exploration and survival. 2013 Skyhorse Publishing p. 344.  

Mountains of George V Land